Goat River is a railway point on the Canadian National Railway west of McBride, British Columbia.  It is located near the mouth of the Goat River.

Via Rail's Jasper – Prince Rupert train calls at the Goat River railway station.

References
BCGNIS Geographical Name Query

Unincorporated settlements in British Columbia